Lora Aborn Busck (May 30, 1907 – August 25, 2005) was an American composer.

Biography
Lora Aborn was born in New York City and began studying piano, music theory and composition at the Effa Ellis Perfield School of Music. She continued studying piano and voice in California and played in a jazz band. She attended Oberlin Conservatory where she studied composition under Dr. George W. Andrews.

Aborn continued her studies at the American Conservatory in Chicago under John Palmer and was awarded a gold medal for composition at graduation. She composed a number of commissioned works, and her music has been played and recorded in the United States, China and Europe. She was honored in a list of top American women composers.

For many years, Aborn was the organist, director of music and composer-in-residence at the Unitarian Universalist Church, Frank Lloyd Wright’s Unity Temple. She married Harry Busck, an antiquarian book seller who died in 1999, and had two daughters. Aborn died August 25, 2005, in Chicago.

A species of moth was named Lora Aborn's moth in her honor.

Works
Aborn composed five full length ballets, two operas, works for chamber choir, vocal solos and choral works.

Ballet:
American Woman
In My Landscape
The Lonely Ones
Reunion
Strange New Street
American Ditties (Group of 4 dances)
Boston John (Shaker)
Casey At The Bat
The Critic
Hot Afternoons in Montana (Lament)
The Lawyer
Nostalgia
Punch Drunk (Parade)
Strawberry Roan

Opera:
Gift of the Magi – 1 act
Mitty – 1 act

Orchestra:
Ethan Frome
Hiawatha's Childhood
In My Landscape
The Mystic Trumpeter
Reunion
Rhapsody for Two Pianos & Orchestra
Song of Life
Symphony in A Minor (Birdsong Symphony)
Tone Poem for String Orchestra

Organ (solo):
Canons, Preludes and Fugues
Chorale – Prelude
Chorale and Variations
Toccata (from Greatest of These)

Organ and other instruments:
Such Stuff As Dreams Are Made On
Mystic Trumpeter
Threnody
Ethan Frome

Piano:
Andante Cantabile (from "Mitty")
Cappricio Fantastico (Scherzo)
Ditties(piano arr.of 4 dances)
Etude I
Etude II
Four pieces for children
Fugue in Blue
Fugue in Yellow'''In My LandscapeLamentParade (satire of French Street Band)Poetic musicSonata in E MinorToccata for PianoTwo-voice EtudeWaltz (from American Woman)Waltz and Berceuse (from Reunion)Capriccio FantasticoFugue in YellowJazz ToccataWaltz (a Duet from American Woman)

Choral:All Creatures of Our God & King (Alleluia)Alleluia MotetBless Jehovah O My SoulBow Down Thine Ear, O LordCanticle of PraiseCanticle of the BellsChicago, Prairie Gem of IllinoisChristmas Carol, The Holly & The IvyChristmas NightCreation (Song of Life)Give Us New Dreams for OldHarp of the North (Male Chorus)Hiawatha's ChildhoodHow Far Is It To BethlehemIf Ye Love MeIn the Lonely MidnightLittle Children, Wake & ListenLo, The Day of Days is HereNow Wander, Sweet Mary (Wolf-Aborn arr.)The Glory of the SpringThe Kings of the EastTo MusicWhen The Herds Were WatchingSolo voice:A Good Wife (Proverbs 31)Alone in the NightAmerican NamesAncient Prayer (on The Wall of an Inn)Apache Indian Wedding BlessingAwake, Awake For Night Is FlyingCasey At The BatDo Not Go Gently Into That GoodnightEach In His Own TongueFall Leaves FallFor Everything There Is a SeasonGod is Our Refuge and StrengthGreat Spirit Whose Voice I Hear in the WindsHigh O'er The Lonely HillsHoar FrostHow Do I Love TheeI Asked The Heaven of StarsInfluenceHer Love Is Like An IslandMake Me An Instrument of Thy PeaceMiracles (Whitman)My Country Is The WorldMy GiftMy Shepherd is The Lord My GodNew Dreams for Old (God Who Through Ages Past)Night Is ComeNight Song At AmalfiNirvanaNow That Spring is in The World (Easter Prayer)O Brother ManOnce More, The Liberal YearOnce To Every Man and NationPierrotPrivate EnterprisePsalms from the Pilgrim Song BookRomanceSalutation of the Dawn (Look To This Day)Shall I Compare Thee to a Summer's DaySolfege In G (a memorial)Song of Songs (Solomon)Songs For Chatka – 8 Nursery SongsSummer Days Are Come AgainThank You God For This Most Amazing DayThe Greatest of These – 3 songs from Cor 13The Hallowed SeasonThe Prince of PeaceThe ShellThe Waters Mid Their Lilies SleptThere Is A Lady Sweet And KindT'is Winter NowToday The Peace of AutumnUnheard, The Dews Around Me FallWeep You No More, Sad FountainsWhat Tomas And Buile Said – I Saw God''

References

External links
Official Website

1907 births
20th-century classical composers
American music educators
American women music educators
American women classical composers
American classical composers
American women classical pianists
American classical pianists
2005 deaths
American opera composers
Oberlin Conservatory of Music alumni
American Conservatory of Music alumni
20th-century classical pianists
Women opera composers
20th-century American women pianists
20th-century American pianists
20th-century American composers
20th-century women composers
21st-century American women